Choi Jung-hwa (born 20 May 1954) is the only son of General Choi Hong-hi, who is regarded as the founder of Taekwondo.

Biography
Choi Jung-hwa studied Taekwon-Do since the age of 7 under his father and many prominent high ranking Taekwon-Do Masters during their visits and stays with General Choi. His claimed earliest recollections of training are around the time General Choi was appointed as Korea's Ambassador to Malaysia.

Choi spent his early childhood training on the lawn of the Embassy compound, as there were no dojangs established at that point. He grew up in an environment surrounded by Taekwon-Do due to General Choi's schedule and work in spreading Taekwon-Do globally. Choi Jung-hwa trained with many high-ranking instructors during this period.

International Taekwon-Do Federation
Choi held the post of Secretary General and Vice Secretary of the ITF for several years until elected as Choi Hong-hi's successor to the Presidency by the ITF members in 2001. He allegedly offered that General Choi should remain ITF President for the first 2 years of that term as to give him the opportunity to "retire with dignity" in 2003. General Choi Hong-hi died less than 12 months later.

Choi Jung-hwa was promoted to 9th Degree Black Belt in 2005 and to the rank of Grandmaster. Choi prefers the title of President or Master to Grandmaster.

He has been a regular visitor to Australia since the mid-1990s.

After his father's death he formed his own International Taekwondo Federation. Prior to forming his own Taekwondo organization he was a Vice Secretary of his father's ITF organization.

Choi Jung-hwa still works extensively promoting Taekwon-Do around the world and is accredited with introducing and developing Taekwon-Do in many Eastern European countries such as Poland, Yugoslavia, Czechoslovakia, Romania, the former USSR and the Democratic People's Republic of Korea.

Under his leadership, the ITF historically returned to South Korea for its 2004 ITF World Championships. ITF has now commenced re-establishing itself in South Korea, Choi Jung-hwa's country of birth. 
"As an organization, we must become sensitive to the changes around us and be able to cope, without compromising the principles – that is, to maintain this purity of technique and philosophy that General Choi handed down to us…..Don't forget the standards include moral as well as technical."

Emigration to Canada and conviction
In 1971 Choi Jung-hwa emigrated to Canada. In 1983 Choi was convicted in Canada on charges that he conspired to assassinate the President of South Korea Chun Doo-Hwan. He was sentenced in Canada, and was barred from South Korea (this has since been rescinded).
 He was convicted in absentia, and travelled as a Taekwon-Do instructor in the then "Eastern Bloc" nations; mainly Yugoslavia and in the DPRK as well. It wasn't until several years later that he returned to Canada to finish his prison term.

References

External links
 Choi Jung-hwa on the ITF website.
 General Choi Hong-hi on the ITF website.

1951 births
Living people
People from Jeju Province
South Korean male taekwondo practitioners
South Korean emigrants to Canada
People convicted in absentia
People convicted of attempted murder
People convicted of treason
Sports executives and administrators